Jones Memorial Library may refer to:

 Jones Memorial Library (Lynchburg, Virginia), United States
 B.F. Jones Memorial Library, Aliquippa, Pennsylvania, United States